The St. Anthony of Padua Parish Church (Spanish: Iglesia Parroquial de San Antonio de Padua), originally known as Camaligan Church,  is a Roman Catholic church in Camaligan, Camarines Sur, Philippines. It is the one of the two parish churches of the Roman Catholic Archdiocese of Caceres located in the town of Camaligan. The parish was established in 1795. The first church structure of Camaligan that was made of stones and woods was burnt in the year 1856. The current church architecture was only completed in 1857, a year after the original structure was burnt. Though, it is still considered one of the oldest churches in Camarines Sur that is very rich in religious and cultural history, and a popular spot for Visita Iglesia.

The church is under the Vicariate of St. John the Evangelist.  As of June 18, 2018, the current parish priest is Rev. Fr.  Glenn C. Ruiz.

History
Camaligan was under the ecclesiastical and civil jurisdiction of Nueva Caceres (now Naga City) for almost two centuries, from year 1578 to 1775.

In the year 1775, the town became an independent political unit under the administration of Bishop Domingo Ollantes of Nueva Caceres. However,  it was only in 1795 when Fray Rafael Benevente, was appointed parish priest by the Franciscan mission.

A church made of stones and wooden structures was built,  but was burnt in the year 1856.

A year after the burning of the original church, in 1857, during the term of Fray Juan Ontiveros as parish priest, the present church structure was completed. It is said that when this church was built, the real intention of the friars was to wipe out pre-colonial lifestyle and practices of the newly-colonized town from looking back to their pre-colonial lifestyle and practices. In fact, the land where the church stands is a former burial ground during pre-colonial times.

Gallery

References

External links

Roman Catholic churches in Camarines Sur
Baroque architecture in the Philippines
Spanish Colonial architecture in the Philippines
Churches in the Roman Catholic Archdiocese of Caceres